DaVanche "Ron" Galimore (born March 7, 1959) is an American former gymnast. He was the United States artistic gymnastics champion in floor exercise in 1977, 1979, and 1980; and in vault in 1977, 1979, 1980, and 1981. He was one of the members of the 1980 U.S. Olympic team, although that team was never sent to Moscow because of a U.S.-led boycott of the 1980 Summer Olympics. He was one of 461 athletes to receive a Congressional Gold Medal years later.

He served as Chief Operating Officer of USA Gymnastics from 2011 until his resignation on November 16, 2018.

References

External links
 
 
 

1959 births
Living people
American male artistic gymnasts
African-American male gymnasts
Congressional Gold Medal recipients
21st-century African-American people
20th-century African-American sportspeople
Iowa State Cyclones men's gymnastics